Sammy Miller (nicknamed "Slam'n Sammy") was a dragster and funny car builder in the 1970s and 1980s.

Miller was responsible for the "Miller Wedge" digger in 1974 and the rocket-powered Vanishing Point Vega FC in the 1980s.

The Wedge was allegedly a product of Miller's dislike of repeated funny car fires.  It featured bicycle front wheels, a low-mounted, front-sloping rear wing, and a mid-mounted engine (placed further ahead of the rear axle than most similar dragsters).

Miller was killed in an accident on Tuesday 29th October 2002 whilst working in the Texas oilfields for his company Applied Force.

Notes

Fastest quarter mile run ever.
3.22 @402 mph.

Sources
Taylor, Thom.  "Beauty Beyond the Twilight Zone" in Hot Rod, April 2017, pp. 30–43.

American automobile designers
Drag racing
2002 deaths
Industrial accident deaths
Accidental deaths in Texas